The I Love You Tour was a tour supporting Diana Ross' latest album I Love You. The tour began in April 2007 in the United States and eventually visited Europe and Canada.

Opening act
Anthony Callea (Australia)

Setlist
The following setlist is obtained from the November 4, 2007 concert, held at the Paramount Theatre in Oakland, California. It does not represent all concerts during the tour.
"Overture" (contains elements of "Take Me Higher")
"I'm Coming Out"
"My World Is Empty Without You" / "Where Did Our Love Go" / "Baby Love" / "Stop! In the Name of Love" / "You Can't Hurry Love"
"Instrumental Sequence"
"Touch Me in the Morning"
"Love Hangover"
"The Boss"
"It's My House"
"Love Child"
"What About Love"
"I'm Still Waiting"
"Upside Down"
"Ease on Down the Road"
"Instrumental Sequence"
"Fine and Mellow"
"Don't Explain"
"Why Do Fools Fall in Love"
Encore
"Theme from Mahogany (Do You Know Where You're Going To)"
"Ain't No Mountain High Enough"
"I Will Survive"

Tour dates

Festivals and other miscellaneous appearances
Melbourne Cup Carnival Chairman's Dinner
Benefit for El Centro Cultural Mexicano
Benefit for the Christus Health Foundation
Plymouth Jazz Festival

References

 http://www.dianarosstour.com/
 https://web.archive.org/web/20090811075305/http://www.insidesocal.com/outinhollywood/2007/04/diana-ross-earns-strong-review.html
 http://www.tourdates.co.uk/news/9359-diana-ross-unveils-spring-tour

2007 concert tours
2008 concert tours
Diana Ross concert tours